Irby Harvy Koffman (March 15, 1899 – November 18, 1968) was an American football coach and a public school superintendent.  He was the first head football coach at Murray State University–then known as Murray State College–serving for one season, in 1924, and compiling record of 3–3–3.  After leaving coaching, Koffman served as a public school superintendent at several schools, including one in Gibson County, Tennessee from 1934 to 1939.

Head coaching record

References

External links
 

1899 births
1968 deaths
20th-century American educators
Murray State University alumni
Murray State Racers football coaches